Hong Jin-Gi (born 20 October 1990) is a South Korean footballer who plays as a centre back for Busan IPark.

Club career statistics

External links 

1990 births
Living people
Association football defenders
South Korean footballers
Jeonnam Dragons players
K League 1 players